Reußenköge is a sparsely populated municipality in the district of Nordfriesland, in Schleswig-Holstein, Germany. It is situated directly adjacent the shoreline of the North Sea coast, in a driving distance of in between 15 up to 29 km northwest of the county-capital city of Husum.

The municipality includes a number of six populated polders, two of which were financed by Count Heinrich XLIII of Reuß-Schleiz-Köstritz and his wife Louise and thus bear the names Louisen-Reußen-Koog (const. 1799) and Reußenkoog (1789). Additional polders are:

 Sophien-Magdalenen-Koog (const. 1742)
 Desmerciereskoog (1767)
 Cecilienkoog (1905)
 Sönke-Nissen-Koog (1926)
 Beltringharder Koog (only unsettled northern part) (1987)

A further non-residential location within the municipality is the Hamburger Hallig. In former times being a settled part of the island of Alt-Nordstrand, it was split up from the rest by the Burchardi Flood in the year 1634.

References

Nordfriesland